Elvend may refer to:
 Əlvənd, Azerbaijan
 Elvend, Iran